Karl Adam Heinisch (23 March 1847 – 29 December 1923) was a German painter.
Karl Heinisch was born in Neustadt (now Prudnik, Poland). On 4 May 1870 he started going to Academy of Fine Arts in Munich. He died in Munich at the age of 76.

Paintings by Karl Heinisch

References 

19th-century German painters
19th-century German male artists
People from Prudnik
Academy of Fine Arts, Munich
1847 births
1923 deaths
20th-century German painters
20th-century German male artists